The half-cent coin was a Dutch coin used from 1818 to 1940. It was the smallest-denomination coin of the decimal Dutch guilder until its withdrawal from circulation after the German occupation of the Netherlands in 1940. It was nicknamed "Halfje", similar to the Kwartje (the suffix -je is a diminutive in the Dutch language, similar to the English -ie).

The second version was used until 1940. A half-cent was not used in the coinage during the German occupation and was not reinstated after the liberation of the Netherlands.

Dimensions and weight

Versions

References

External links
Obverses and reverses

Guilder
Coins of the Netherlands
Half-cent coins